Kurt Gerstenberg (23 July 1886, Chemnitz − 2 November 1968, Würzburg) was a German art historian, a pupil of Heinrich Wölfflin. Gerstenberg's 1913 work Deutsche Sondergotik (German Special Gothic) gave the name to Sondergotik, a style of Late Gothic architecture.

1968 deaths
1886 births
German art historians